Putao xianzi (葡萄仙子 The Grape Fairy) is a popular children's opera by Chinese composer Li Jinhui, originally written 1922-1923 and most notably staged in a revised and expanded version in Shanghai in 1927. It was the one of the most successful of the composer's children's operas. It gave its name to Wong Tin-lam's Hong Kong-made Mandarin film Angel of the Vineyard starring Chung Ching in 1956.

References

Operas
1927 operas